Christian Mieritz (born 30 September 1997) is a Danish ice hockey defenceman currently playing for Frederikshavn White Hawks of the Danish Metal Ligaen.

References

External links
 

1997 births
Living people
Leksands IF players
Danish ice hockey defencemen
Guelph Storm players
Rødovre Mighty Bulls players
Frederikshavn White Hawks players
Hamilton Bulldogs (OHL) players
People from Rødovre
Sportspeople from the Capital Region of Denmark